There are many memorials to Queen Victoria, including:
Victoria Memorial, Kolkata
Victoria Memorial, London
Victoria Monument, Liverpool
Victoria Memorial (Montreal)
Queen Victoria Memorial (Melbourne)
Queen Victoria Memorial, Lancaster
Queen Victoria Statue, Bristol
Frogmore Mausoleum, Queen Victoria's burial place

See also
List of statues of Queen Victoria
Victoria Tower (Guernsey)
Victoria Memorial Hall (Singapore)
Victoria Memorial Museum (Ottawa)
Victoria Memorial Square (Toronto)